Trachys troglodytiformis is a species of metallic wood-boring beetle in the family Buprestidae. It is found in Europe and Northern Asia (excluding China) and North America.

References

Further reading

External links

 

Buprestidae
Articles created by Qbugbot
Beetles described in 1918